Alopecosa cronebergi is a wolf spider species in the genus Alopecosa found in Ukraine, Russia, Kazakhstan, and Hungary (which is "doubtful"). The species was first described by Tamerlan Thorell in 1875, as Tarentula cronebergi. It was transferred to the genus Alopecosa in 1955 by Carl Friedrich Roewer.

See also 
 List of Lycosidae species

References 

cronebergi
Spiders of Europe
Spiders of Russia
Spiders of Asia
Spiders described in 1875